Tropical Depression Five-E was a tropical depression which made landfall along the south-western Mexican coastline in July 2008. It was the fifth tropical cyclone of the 2008 Pacific hurricane season. The depression developed out of a weak tropical wave which formed off the coast of Africa on June 23. The wave remained poorly organized throughout its journey through the Atlantic Ocean and Caribbean Sea. The wave entered the Eastern Pacific on July 2 after passing through Central America. The wave developed into an area of low pressure that afternoon.

The low moved towards the northwest, paralleling the coastline. Continued development led to the eventual upgrade of the low to Tropical Depression Five-E on July 5. It was initially thought that the depression would become a tropical storm before landfall but the winds failed to increase above . The depression made a turn towards the north-northwest and made landfall on July 7. It dissipated shortly after landfall due to the mountainous terrain. These rains triggered flooding that killed two people and left roughly MXN 30 million ($2.2 million) in damages.

Meteorological history

Tropical Depression Five-E formed out of a weak tropical wave, associated with scattered convection, which formed off the coast of Africa on June 23. Some cyclonic turning was noted and convection was on either side of the axis— the center of the storm—but was mainly in association with the Intertropical Convergence Zone (ITCZ). The wave remained very close to the intertropical convergence zone for the next several days without any further development.

On June 26, a small burst of moisture in the system was noted in the area of the wave, but no other notable development occurred. On July 2, the wave moved over Central America and produced scattered areas of strong convection off the coast of Honduras. Later in the day, the center of the wave became elongated as determined by a QuikSCAT satellite pass. By the afternoon, the wave developed into an area of low pressure and a tropical cyclone formation alert was issued as the possibility of a tropical cyclone developing within 48 hours was present.

Not long after the alert was issued, deep convection disappeared from the low while located 400 mi (645 km). Convection was anticipated to redeveloped later that night or early the next morning. The low was moving slowly towards the northwest due to a deep trough located over the Gulf of Mexico and a ridge of high pressure located over western Mexico. The low remained disorganized for the next two days as it steadily moved towards the northwest.

During the morning of July 5, deep convection rapidly increased and banding features formed despite strong easterly wind shear. The convection persisted into the afternoon and the low was upgraded to Tropical Depression Five-E accordingly. Following the storm's upgrade, further development did not occur as the system tracked steadily towards the north-northwest. Rapid weakening followed shortly after landfall and the storm dissipated several hours later over the mountains of Mexico.

Preparations and impact

As Tropical Depression Five-E approached Mexico, the country's government released tropical storm watches and warnings for certain parts of the coastline. When the tropical depression formed on July 5, the government issued a tropical storm warning from Acapulco to Zihuatanejo. Other interests in the Pacific Ocean were asked to keep an eye on the developing depression. The morning of July 6, the Mexican government issued a tropical storm watch for Zihuatanejo to Manzanillo. The earlier tropical storm warning remained in effect, for another six hours, when the warning was demoted into a tropical storm watch. On the afternoon of July 6, the government discontinued the tropical storm watch up to Acapulco. The remaining tropical storm watch was discontinued on July 7, after the tropical depression had made landfall and began to weaken. The government's weather center also released thirteen tropical cyclone bulletins and four warnings for personal caution.

The tropical depression produced  of rain in Manzanillo, with other locations also experiencing isolated rainfall. Cerro de Ortega, Colima reported  of rain in a 24-hour period. The community of Ometepec reported . One person was swept away by flood waters, reaching  in depth. Heavy rains from the depression resulted in a traffic accident that killed one person and injured two others. In all, damages from the storm amounted to MXN 30 million ($2.2 million).

See also

2008 Pacific hurricane season
Timeline of the 2008 Pacific hurricane season

References

External links

The NHC's archive on Tropical Depression Five-E.
 on Tropical Depression Five-E.
The NHC's Tropical Cyclone Outlook for the Eastern Pacific.

2008 Pacific hurricane season
05E
05E
5-E